Sanford is a statutory town in Conejos County, Colorado, United States. The population was 879 at the 2010 census.

A post office called Sanford has been in operation since 1888. The town was named after Silas Sanford Smith, a Mormon pioneer.

Geography
Sanford is located in northeastern Conejos County at  (37.257437, -105.900591), in the San Luis Valley of southern Colorado.

Demographics

As of the census of 2000, there were 817 people, 273 households, and 212 families residing in the town. The racial makeup of the town was 76.87% White, 0.12% African American, 0.73% Native American, 16.65% from other races, and 5.63% from two or more races. Hispanic or Latino of any race were 40.51% of the population.

There were 273 households, out of which 45.1% had children under the age of 18 living with them, 61.5% were married couples living together, 12.8% had a female householder with no husband present, and 22.3% were non-families. 20.5% of all households were made up of individuals, and 10.6% had someone living alone who was 65 years of age or older.  The average household size was 2.99 and the average family size was 3.50.

In the town, the population was spread out, with 35.3% under the age of 18, 11.0% from 18 to 24, 25.1% from 25 to 44, 17.9% from 45 to 64, and 10.8% who were 65 years of age or older.  The median age was 28 years. For every 100 females there were 101.2 males.  For every 100 females age 18 and over, there were 96.7 males.

The median income for a household in the town was $25,625, and the median income for a family was $30,469. Males had a median income of $25,268 versus $17,212 for females. The per capita income for the town was $11,087.  About 15.7% of families and 20.1% of the population were below the poverty line, including 24.8% of those under age 18 and 13.1% of those age 65 or over.

See also

 List of municipalities in Colorado
 Pike's Stockade
 San Luis Valley

References

External links

 
 CDOT map of the Town of Sanford

Towns in Conejos County, Colorado